The 1987–88 Ohio Bobcats men's basketball team represented Ohio University in the college basketball season of 1987–88. The team was coached by Billy Hahn and played their home games at the Convocation Center.

Schedule

|-
!colspan=9 style=| Non-conference regular season

|-
!colspan=9 style=| MAC regular season

|-

|-
!colspan=9 style=| MAC Tournament

Source:

Statistics

Team Statistics
Final 1987–88 Statistics

Source

Player statistics

Source

References

General
Ohio Record Book 

Ohio Bobcats men's basketball seasons
Ohio
1987 in sports in Ohio
1988 in sports in Ohio